The Brixton by-election was held on the 27 June 1927 following the elevation to the peerage of Davison Dalziel, he became Lord Dalziel of Wooler. The Conservative Party retained the seat with a reduced majority of 4,326.

Candidates
 Nigel Colman, the Unionist Party candidate was a business man, a breeder and exhibitor of light horses and represented Brixton on the London County Council.
 Frederick Joseph Laverack was the Liberal Party candidate. He was a non-conformist lay preacher, who had represented Brixton between 1923 and 1924.
 James Adams was the Labour Party candidate, he was a member of the Shop Assistants' Union.

Results

References

See also 
 List of United Kingdom by-elections (1918–1931)

1927 elections in the United Kingdom
Brixton by-election
Brixton,1927
Brixton,1927
Brixton